Manusela may refer to:

Animal
 Manusela mosaic-tailed rat, a species of rodent that is found in Indonesia
 Chloroclystis manusela, a species of moth that is found in Indonesia

Anthropology
 Manusela people, an idigineous people from Seram island, Indonesia
 Manusela language, spoken by Manusela people

Place
 Manusela National Park, located in Seram island, Indonesia